Cortland is a city in central Trumbull County, Ohio, United States. The population was 7,105 at the 2020 census. It is part of the Youngstown–Warren metropolitan area.

History
The area was once known as Baconsburg, after Samuel Bacon, who built a sawmill and several buildings in the area during the early 19th century. Cortland became a village in 1874 with the construction of a railroad depot. It became a city in 1980 when its population exceeded 5,000 people.

Geography
It lies along the eastern shore of Mosquito Creek Lake and the accompanying Mosquito Lake State Park.

The following highways pass through Cortland:
   State Route 5
   State Route 46

Demographics

2010 census
As of the census of 2010, there were 7,104 people, 3,010 households, and 2,032 families living in the city. The racial makeup of the city was 97.0% White, 1.2% African American, 0.2% Native American, 0.5% Asian, 0.2% from other races, and 0.9% from two or more races. Hispanic or Latino of any race were 0.9% of the population.

There were 3,010 households, of which 29.2% had children under the age of 18 living with them, 54.3% were married couples living together, 9.6% had a female householder with no husband present, 3.7% had a male householder with no wife present, and 32.5% were non-families. 28.6% of all households were made up of individuals, and 14.4% had someone living alone who was 65 years of age or older. The average household size was 2.33 and the average family size was 2.86.

The median age in the city was 44.4 years. 22% of residents were under the age of 18; 6.4% were between the ages of 18 and 24; 22.3% were from 25 to 44; 30.7% were from 45 to 64; and 18.6% were 65 years of age or older. The gender makeup of the city was 47.0% male and 53.0% female.

2000 census
As of 2000, there were 6,830 people, 2,738 households, and 1,968 families living in the city. The population density was 1,524.8 people per square mile (588.6/km2). There were 2,899 housing units at an average density of 647.2 per square mile (249.8/km2). The racial makeup of the city was 97.61% White, 0.94% African American, 0.12% Native American, 0.38% Asian, 0.12% from other races, and 0.83% from two or more races. Hispanic or Latino of any race were 0.75% of the population.

There were 2,738 households, out of which 32.6% had children under the age of 18 living with them, 59.5% were married couples living together, 10.0% had a female householder with no husband present, and 28.1% were non-families. 24.3% of all households were made up of individuals, and 10.6% had someone living alone who was 65 years of age or older. The average household size was 2.48 and the average family size was 2.97.

In the city the population was spread out, with 24.6% under the age of 18, 7.4% from 18 to 24, 26.5% from 25 to 44, 27.9% from 45 to 64, and 13.5% who were 65 years of age or older. The median age was 40 years. For every 100 females, there were 90.0 males. For every 100 females age 18 and over, there were 85.5 males.

The median income for a household in the city was $50,941 and the median income for a family was $62,441. Males had a median income of $50,739 versus $28,320 for females. The per capita income for the city was $22,972. About 4.6% of families and 5.3% of the population were below the poverty line, including 6.3% of those under age 18 and 3.0% of those age 65 or over.

Education
Lakeview Local Schools operates one Pk-8 Building and one high school (Lakeview High School).  A few residences within the easternmost portions of the city of Cortland, closest to SR-11, are zoned for the Mathews Local School District. Residences north of Bradley Brownlee Road are in the Maplewood Local School District. 

Cortland has a public library, a branch of the Warren-Trumbull County Public Library.

References

External links
 City website

Cities in Trumbull County, Ohio
Populated places established in 1874
1874 establishments in Ohio
Cities in Ohio